Giacomo Candido (10 July 1871, in Guagnano – 30 December 1941, in Galatina) was an Italian mathematician and historian of mathematics.

Education and career
In 1897 Candido received his Laurea (teaching degree) from the University of Pisa and started to teach mathematics: first, at the Liceo of Galatina, then at the Liceo of Campobasso and from 1927 at the Liceo of Brindisi.

He was an editor and contributor for the Periodico di Matematica per l'Insegnamento secondario and was one of the founders of the journal La Matematica elementare (an intermediate-level journal for teachers, engineers and students).

He was an Invited Speaker of the ICM in 1928 in Bologna and in 1932 in Zürich. In 1934 he founded the Apulian branch of Mathesis, an Italian association of mathematics teachers.

He is also remembered for his work on the history of mathematics.

Candido's identity

Candido devised his eponymous identity to prove that

where Fn is the nth Fibonacci number.
The identity of Candido is that, for all real numbers x and y,

It is easy to prove that the identity holds in any commutative ring.

Selected publications
 [https://babel.hathitrust.org/cgi/pt?id=hvd.32044102938495;view=1up;seq=348 Sulle funzioni Un , Vn di Lucas] in Periodica matematica, anno XVII, 1901–1902
 , Tipografia editrice salentina, 1903
 Su d'un' applicazione delle funzioni Un , Vn di Lucas in Periodica matematica, anno XX, 1904–1905
 Le equazioni reciproche in senso generale in Periodico matematica, anno XXI, 1905–1906
 Il fondo Palagi-Libri della Biblioteca Moreniana di Firenze, in Atti del II Congresso della Unione Matematica Italiana, ed. Cremonese, 1941
 Sulla mancata pubblicazione nel 1826 della celebre memoria di Abel, ed. Marra, Galatina, 1942
 Conferenze e discorsi, ed. Marra, Galatina, 1943
 Scritti matematici'', ed. Marzocco, Firenze, 1948

References

1871 births
1941 deaths
19th-century Italian mathematicians
20th-century Italian mathematicians
People from the Province of Lecce